The commune of Nyabikere is a commune of Karuzi Province in central Burundi. The capital lies at Nyabikere.

References

Communes of Burundi
Karuzi Province